Hamdi Harbaoui (born 5 January 1985) is a Tunisian footballer who plays as a striker.

Club career
Harbaoui started his career in his home country with Espérance Tunis.

In the winter transfer window in season 2007–08, Harbaoui joined Belgian side Mouscron, who loaned him to Visé. After two successful seasons with Visé he was signed by OH Leuven, who were at that time playing in the Belgian Second Division. At OH Leuven, he immediately became a key player, scoring 25 goals during the 2010–11 season and thereby became the second division top scorer. Having helped OH Leuven to promotion to the Belgian Pro League, he signed with Lokeren.

With Lokeren, he won the 2011–12 Belgian Cup, scoring the only goal in the cup final. In the 2013–14 season, still with Lokeren, he won the Belgian Cup again and also became the season's top scorer in the league with 22 goals in 33 games.

In July 2014, Harbaoui moved to Qatar SC on a two-year contract, for a reported transfer fee of €2.5 million

On 9 May 2016, Harbaoui signed a three-year contract with Italian side Udinese Calcio.

On 30 August 2016, just three months after joining Udinese and without having made an appearance in a competitive match, Harbaoui returned to Belgium, moving to Anderlecht on a one-year deal. In January 2017, he was sent out on loan to Charleroi for the second half of the season.

International goals
As of match played 3 June 2016. Tunisia score listed first, score column indicates score after each Harbaoui goal.

Honours 
ES Tunis
 Tunisian Ligue Professionnelle 1: 2003–04, 2005–06
 Tunisian Cup: 2005–06, 2006–07, 2007–08

Lokeren
 Belgian Cup: 2011–12, 2013–14

Individual
 Belgian Second Division top scorer: 2010–11
 Belgian Lion Award: 2013, 2014
 Belgian First Division A top scorer: 2013–14, 2017–18, 2018–19

References

External links
 

1985 births
Living people
People from Bizerte
Association football forwards
Tunisian footballers
Tunisian expatriate footballers
Tunisia international footballers
Royal Excel Mouscron players
Espérance Sportive de Tunis players
Oud-Heverlee Leuven players
C.S. Visé players
K.S.C. Lokeren Oost-Vlaanderen players
Qatar SC players
Udinese Calcio players
R.S.C. Anderlecht players
R. Charleroi S.C. players
S.V. Zulte Waregem players
Al-Arabi SC (Qatar) players
Expatriate footballers in Belgium
Expatriate footballers in Qatar
Belgian Pro League players
Challenger Pro League players
Qatar Stars League players
2013 Africa Cup of Nations players
Expatriate footballers in Italy
Tunisian expatriate sportspeople in Qatar
Tunisian expatriate sportspeople in Italy